The 2023 season is Terengganu's Sixth season in the Malaysia Super League having been promoted from the Malaysia Premier League at the end of the 2016 season. The club will also participate in the Malaysia FA Cup, Malaysia Cup, Piala Sumbangsih and AFC Cup.

Management and staff

Players

First-team squad

 U23

 A

 U23
 I
 I
 S
 A
 I

 U23

 U23

 I

 S

 I

Remarks:
I These players are registered as International player.
A These players are registered as Asian player.
S These players are registered as ASEAN player.
U23 These players are registered as Under-23 player.
U18 These players are registered as Under-18 player.

Out on loan

Other players under contract

Friendly

Pre-season and friendlies
2023 Thailand Tour (7 – 14 February)

Competitions

Malaysia Super League

League table

Malaysia FA Cup

Malaysia Cup

Piala Sumbangsih

AFC Cup

Player statistics

Appearances and goals

|-
|colspan="13"|Players who left the club during the 2023 season
|-
|}

Transfers

Players in

Players out

Loans in

Loans out

References

Terengganu FC seasons
Terengganu
Malaysian football club seasons by club